Andrei Nilă (born 16 August 1985) is a Romanian former professional footballer who played as a forward for ARO Muscelul Câmpulung. Born in Vatra Dornei, Nilă grew up at the academy of Argeș Pitești and played most of his career for Mioveni and Argeș Pitești, with short periods spent at Building Vânju Mare and Muscelul Câmpulung. Nilă made his Liga I debut on 22 July 2011 for Mioveni in a 0-1 defeat against Universitatea Cluj.

References

External links
 
 

1985 births
Living people
People from Vatra Dornei
Romanian footballers
Association football forwards
Liga I players
Liga II players
Liga III players
CS Mioveni players
FC Argeș Pitești players